Yves Martial Tadissi (born 26 August 1991) is a Hungarian karateka. He won the silver medal in the men's 67 kg kumite event at the 2016 World Karate Championships held in Linz, Austria. He is also a four-time bronze medalist in this event at the European Karate Championships.

Career 

He competed in the men's 67 kg event at the 2017 World Games held in Wrocław, Poland. He won one match and lost two matches in the elimination round and he did not advance to compete in the semi-finals.

In 2018, he competed in the men's 67 kg event at the World Karate Championships held in Madrid, Spain. In 2019, he won one of the bronze medals in the men's kumite 67 kg event at the European Games held in Minsk, Belarus.

In June 2021, he reached the round-robin stage in his weight class at the World Olympic Qualification Tournament in Paris, France where he failed to qualify to compete at the 2020 Summer Olympics in Tokyo, Japan. In November 2021, he lost his bronze medal match in the men's 67 kg event at the 2021 World Karate Championships held in Dubai, United Arab Emirates.

He won the silver medal in the men's kumite 67 kg event at the 2022 World Games held in Birmingham, United States.

Achievements

References

External links 
 

Living people
1991 births
Place of birth missing (living people)
Hungarian male karateka
European Games bronze medalists for Hungary
European Games medalists in karate
Karateka at the 2015 European Games
Karateka at the 2019 European Games
World Games medalists in karate
World Games silver medalists
Competitors at the 2017 World Games
Competitors at the 2022 World Games
21st-century Hungarian people